is a retired Japanese athlete who specialized in the 400 metres hurdles. He was the first Asian to run under 49 seconds in the event.

With a personal best time of 48.64 seconds, achieved in October 1998 in Kumamoto, he is a former Asian record holder. The Asian record currently belongs to Hadi Soua'an Al-Somaily with 47.53 seconds, and the Japanese record to Dai Tamesue.

International competitions

National titles
Japanese Championships
400 metres hurdles: 1992, 1993, 1995, 1998

Personal bests
400 metres – 46.43 (Maebashi 1993)
400 metres hurdles – 48.64 (Kumamoto 1998)

Asian record holder
400 metres hurdles – 48.68 (Tokyo 1993): Former Asian record

See also
List of Asian Games medalists in athletics

References

External links

1972 births
Living people
Sportspeople from Gunma Prefecture
Japanese male hurdlers
Japanese male sprinters
Olympic male hurdlers
Olympic male sprinters
Olympic athletes of Japan
Athletes (track and field) at the 1992 Summer Olympics
Asian Games silver medalists for Japan
Asian Games medalists in athletics (track and field)
Athletes (track and field) at the 1994 Asian Games
Athletes (track and field) at the 1998 Asian Games
Medalists at the 1994 Asian Games
Medalists at the 1998 Asian Games
Universiade silver medalists for Japan
Universiade bronze medalists for Japan
Universiade medalists in athletics (track and field)
Medalists at the 1991 Summer Universiade
Medalists at the 1993 Summer Universiade
Medalists at the 1995 Summer Universiade
World Athletics Championships athletes for Japan
World Athletics Indoor Championships medalists
Japan Championships in Athletics winners
20th-century Japanese people
21st-century Japanese people